This is a list of rides, attractions and themes from Kings Island that no longer exist in the park.

Former roller coasters

Former rides

Former attractions

Former Halloween Haunt attractions

Former shows

Former area themes

See also
List of Kings Island attractions

Notes

References
KIExtreme.com History Gallery / Park Guides
Kings Island Website / Timeline

Lists of former amusement park attractions